Danavorexton (developmental code name TAK-925) is a selective orexin 2 receptor agonist. It is a small-molecule compound and is administered intravenously. The compound was found to dose-dependently produce wakefulness to a similar degree as modafinil in a phase 1 clinical trial. As of March 2021, danavorexton is under development for the treatment of narcolepsy, idiopathic hypersomnia, and sleep apnea. It is related to another orexin receptor agonist known as TAK-994, the development of which was discontinued for safety reasons in October 2021.

See also
 Orexin receptor § Agonists
 List of investigational sleep drugs § Orexin receptor agonists

References

External links
 Danavorexton - AdisInsight

Carboxylic acids
Cyclohexanes
Esters
Ethers
Experimental drugs
Orexin receptor agonists
Piperidines
Sulfonamides